Bagneux is a commune in the Hauts-de-Seine department, in the southern suburbs of Paris, France.

Geography
The commune of Bagneux is surrounded by the following communes, from the north and clockwise: Montrouge, Arcueil, Cachan, Bourg-la-Reine, Sceaux, Fontenay-aux-Roses and Châtillon.

Transport 
Bagneux is served by Bagneux–Lucie Aubrac station on Paris Métro Line 4. Bagneux is also served by two stations on the edge of its boundary - Bagneux station on RER line B (on the territory of the neighbouring commune Cachan), and Barbara on Paris Métro Line 4 (on the territory of the neighbouring commune Montrouge).

Population

Education
Primary schools include:
10 preschools
7 elementary schools

The commune has four junior high schools (collèges): Henri-Barbusse, Joliot-Curie, Romain-Rolland, and École les Jacquets.

The commune has one public senior high school, Lycée professionnel Léonard-de-Vinci. Other public high schools in the area:
 Lycée technique Jean-Jaurès in Châtenay-Malabry
 Lycée Maurice-Genevoix in Montrouge
 Lycée Lakanal in Sceaux
 Lycée Marie-Curie in Sceaux

There is also a private junior and senior high school, Groupe scolaire Saint-Gabriel.

Sites of interest
Château du Comte Beugnot, La Fontaine-Gueffier, supposed to be built for Richelieu
Gnomon (Instrument built in the 17th century)

International relations

Bagneux is twinned with:
 Grand-Bourg, Guadeloupe, France, since 1998
 Turin, Italy, since 1978
 Vanadzor, Armenia, since 2006

See also
Communes of the Hauts-de-Seine department

References

External links

 Bagneux website

Communes of Hauts-de-Seine
Bagneux